Dry Branch is an unincorporated community in Kanawha County, West Virginia, United States. Dry Branch has a post office with ZIP code 25061.

The community takes its name from nearby Dry Branch creek.

References

Unincorporated communities in Kanawha County, West Virginia
Unincorporated communities in West Virginia
Coal towns in West Virginia